Noel Dodo Kipre (born 9 April 1972) is an Ivorian former footballer.

Kipra formerly played with Perak FA in Malaysia. He only had a short stint in Malaysia football league. He then played for FC Energie Cottbus in 2. Fußball-Bundesliga, SV Babelsberg 03 in the Regionalliga Nordost and later for Wuppertaler SV in Regionalliga Nord.

He made five appearances for the Ivory Coast national football team, including playing in the 1998 FIFA World Cup qualifying rounds.

References

External links

Profile at Kicker.de

1972 births
Living people
Ivorian footballers
Ivory Coast international footballers
FC Energie Cottbus players
SV Babelsberg 03 players
Wuppertaler SV players
Perak F.C. players
Ivorian expatriate sportspeople in Malaysia
Association football forwards